Szlachtowa  (Lemko: Шляхтова, Shliakhtova) is a village in the administrative district of Gmina Szczawnica, within Nowy Targ County, Lesser Poland Voivodeship, in southern Poland. It was formerly part of the town of Szczawnica, but was made a separate village on 1 January 2008 (as was Jaworki).

The village used to constitute a part of Ruś Szlachtowska region (with the name derived from Szlachtowa), the westernmost area inhabited by Lemkos.

References

Villages in Nowy Targ County